The surname McLaughlan is a form of the surname McLaughlin (derived from the Irish Mac Lochlainn).

People with the surname

George McLaughlan (1904–?), Scottish footballer
Sandy McLaughlan (born 1936), Scottish footballer
Sonja McLaughlan, BBC newsreader

References

Anglicised Irish-language surnames
Surnames of Irish origin